Shruti Haasan (born 28 January 1986) is an Indian actress and playback singer who primarily works in Telugu, Hindi and Tamil films. She is a recipient of several accolades including two Filmfare Award South and three South Indian International Movie Awards. She has appeared in Forbes India Celebrity 100 list of 2015 and 2016.

Born to actor-filmmaker Kamal Haasan and actress Sarika Thakur, as a child artist, she sang in films and did a guest role in her father's directorial Hey Ram (2000) before making her acting debut with Hindi film Luck (2009), for which she received Stardust Award for Superstar of Tomorrow – Female nomination. She made her Telugu debut with Anaganaga O Dheerudu and Tamil debut with 7aum Arivu both (2011), for both these films she won Filmfare Award for Best Female Debut – South. Haasan went onto established herself in South Indian cinema with successful Telugu films Gabbar Singh (2012), Balupu (2013), Yevadu, Race Gurram both (2014), Srimanthudu (2015), Premam (2016) and Krack (2021). She received SIIMA Award for Best Actress – Telugu for Gabbar Singh, Race Gurram and Srimanthudu. She also won Filmfare Award for Best Actress – Telugu for Race Gurram.

Haasan achieved further recognition  with the Telugu films Oh My Friend (2011) and Veera Simha Reddy (2023) and the Tamil films, Vedalam (2015) and Si3 (2017). Haasan is also known for her work in Hindi cinema. For her performance in D-Day (2013), she received IIFA Award for Best Supporting Actress nomination. Her other notable films include Ramaiya Vastavaiya (2013), Gabbar Is Back and Welcome Back both (2015). Haasan's highest-grossing release came with Waltair Veerayya (2023).

In addition to acting career, Haasan is also an established playback singer and has her own music band. She is a prominent celebrity endorser for brands and products.

Early life and family 

Haasan was born on 28 January 1986 to actors Kamal Haasan and Sarika Thakur in Madras (present-day Chennai) in a Tamil family. Her father is a Tamilian Brahmin Iyengar, while her mother was born to a Maharashtrian father and Rajput mother. Her parents got married when she was one and got divorced in 2004. Haasan's younger sister Akshara Haasan, is also an actress. Actor and lawyer Charuhasan is her uncle. Actresses Suhasini Maniratnam and Anu Hasan are her cousins.

Haasan completed her schooling from Lady Andal school in Chennai and moved to Mumbai to obtain a degree in psychology at St. Andrew's College. Haasan focused on cinema and music, and eventually traveled to the US to continue to learn music at the Musicians Institute in California, before returning to Chennai.

Acting career

Debut and early career (2009–2011) 
Haasan's first appearance in a feature film was a child artist in a cameo role as the daughter of Vallabhbhai Patel in the Tamil-Hindi bilingual Hey Ram, based on a murder attempt on Mahatma Gandhi, directed by her father Kamal Haasan. After rejecting prominent film offers, most notably the lead role in Venkat Prabhu's Saroja, reports suggested in late 2007 that Haasan was set to make her actual acting debut in 2008 with a film opposite Madhavan, directed by Nishikant Kamat. Entitled Endrendrum Punnagai, the film was stalled before production began.

Haasan eventually signed up to feature in Soham Shah's Hindi film Luck, opposite Imran Khan, in July 2008, and shot for the film for nearly a year. Imran Khan, her childhood friend, had recommended her name to the director and Haasan signed on after listening to the entire script and accepted to play a dual role in the action film. Shruti took part in action scenes during filming and worked out extensively. The film opened in July 2009 to unanimously poor reviews from critics and took a poor opening at the box office, with critics stating that she "deserved a better launch vehicle". Reviewers were critical of her performance with Rajeev Masand of IBN stating that she delivers "dialogues with deadpan expressions", while another critic added that she is perhaps "synthetic and fails to impress". Haasan then went on to appear alongside Blaaze in the promotional videos for Unnaipol Oruvan and Eenadu, the bilingual films starring her father, which she had composed the music for. She made a further appearance in a promotional video for the horror film Hisss, starring Mallika Sherawat, where she had also sung a song composed by Dave Kushner.

She made her Telugu debut in January 2011, acting opposite Siddharth in the fantasy adventure film Anaganaga O Dheerudu, directed by Prakash Kovelamudi, son of director K. Raghavendra Rao. The film, co-produced by Walt Disney Pictures, saw Shruti play a gypsy with magic healing powers defended by a swordsman, played by Siddharth. The film opened to positive reviews, with her performance being praised with a critic noting: "Shruti looks quite attractive and makes a wonderful screen presence", while a reviewer from Rediff.com wrote that she "looks beautiful and has a mystical aura about her".

Her second Hindi feature film, Madhur Bhandarkar's romantic comedy Dil Toh Baccha Hai Ji, saw her appear in an extended guest appearance alongside an ensemble cast of Emraan Hashmi, Ajay Devgn and Shazahn Padamsee. The film portrayed her as Nikki Narang, the step-daughter of an ex Miss India model, with Hashmi's character falling for both mother and daughter. Her performance gained poor responses from critics with a reviewer citing that her character has been "reduced to post-interval surfacing, last-ditch glamour", whilst another labelled hers as "so fake that she offers only disappointment"; however, the film went on to become a commercial success at the box office.

In mid-2010, Haasan was signed by AR Murugadoss to star opposite Suriya in his next film 7aum Arivu, and the film's shooting began in June later that year. The director signed after he felt she looked the part of the scientist, mentioning that she seemed "intelligent and beautiful". She played Subha Srinivasan, a young scientist in the film, who hopes to re-activate the genes of 5th century Buddhist monk Bodhidharma, and her performance in the film won appreciation from critics. The film opened to mixed reviews, but became commercially successful. A critic from The Hindu noted: "rarely is a heroine given near-equal footing in Tamil films", describing her as "ravishing but that she ought to work harder on spontaneity, and fine-tune her Tamil accent", but concluded "the point is the actor shows promise". Her next Telugu release was Oh My Friend, a romantic comedy film alongside Siddharth again, which also co-starred Hansika Motwani and Navdeep. The film told the story of childhood friends, and that of their platonic friendship that went on in their adulthood as well, and for the role Shruti Haasan went on to learn the dance of Kuchipudi. The film opened to average reviews with several critics claiming the film evoked a sense of "déjà vu", though a reviewer noted: "Shruti, on her part displays the same conviction."

Breakthrough, success and acclaim (2012–2017) 

Aishwarya Dhanush's directorial debut 3, a romantic drama film co-starring Dhanush, marked a turning point in Haasan's career. Aishwarya revealed that she had written the script with Shruti Haasan in mind, but date problems meant that the film began its shoot with Amala Paul instead. However, in a turn of events, Shruti was re-signed to play the character of Janani, and the film gained much hype prior to release due to the collaboration of herself and Aishwarya, being the daughters of the two leading contemporary Tamil actors Kamal Haasan and Rajinikanth, as did the success of the song "Why This Kolaveri Di?". The film opened in March 2012 to positive reviews, with a critic noting: "Shruti Hassan has come a long way", though the film only garnered average returns at the box office. Her second release in 2012 was Harish Shankar's Telugu film Gabbar Singh, a remake of the 2010 Hindi film Dabangg, with the version featuring her alongside Pawan Kalyan. She played the role of Bhagyalakshmi, a village girl, which had been played by Sonakshi Sinha in the original version. The film went on to become a major commercial success at the box office and brought in more film offers for Haasan. Critics also gave her performance a favourable verdict citing that she "justifies her role" and "though she didn't have much of a role, she has left her mark."

In 2013, she appeared in the Telugu action film Balupu opposite, Ravi Teja, which eventually became a "super-hit" at the Indian box office. She received positive reviews for her performance, with critics noting that she "provides the fun in the film with glamor and verve". Later that year, she starred in two Hindi films, Prabhu Deva's Ramaiya Vastavaiya and Nikkhil Advani's D-Day. In the latter, a spy thriller, she played a prostitute involved with a suspended army officer. She also sung a song for the film, entitled "Alvida". Reviewing the film for Rediff.com, Palomi Sharma found Haasan to be "perfect as a Karachi prostitute with a haunting aura about her". She also starred in the Telugu action film Ramayya Vasthavayya opposite Jr. NTR for the first time. The film received an average response from critics.

Her first release of 2014, the Telugu film Yevadu, opposite Ram Charan, emerged as a major commercial success. Her second Telugu release of the year, Race Gurram, had Haasan star opposite Allu Arjun for the first time in her career. The film emerged as a "blockbuster" success. Along with the rest of the film, she received positive reviews for her performance, with one critic noting that she "plays her part well and looks glamorous". She also had a Tamil release; Poojai, opposite Vishal, and performed her first item number in her career in the Telugu action comedy film Aagadu, starring Mahesh Babu and Tamannaah.

In 2015, Haasan performed her second item number in the Hindi film Tevar, featuring Arjun Kapoor and Sonakshi Sinha. Next, she appeared in multiple films in such as the Hindi film Gabbar Is Back opposite Akshay Kumar, Koratala Siva's Telugu action film Srimanthudu opposite Mahesh Babu, Anees Bazmee's comedy Welcome Back, alongside John Abraham, Anil Kapoor and Nana Patekar and the Tamil films Puli, co-starring Vijay and Vedalam, opposite Ajith Kumar, marking her first collaboration with both the actors.

In 2016 she appeared in Rocky Handsome opposite John Abraham for the second time and in the Telugu film Premam, opposite Naga Chaitanya which was a remake of the Malayalam film Premam. She was signed to the fantasy film Sangamithra, directed by Sundar. C, in which she was to play a warrior. However, citing date issues, she opted out of the film.

In 2017, she appeared in Katamarayudu, which marked her second collaboration with Pawan Kalyan, Si3, with Suriya, for the second time, and Behen Hogi Teri alongside Rajkummar Rao. She made her American television debut in 2019 with the action drama series Treadstone in which she had a recurring role.

Hiatus, return to films and recent work (2018–present) 
Following a three years of hiatus in Indian films, Hassan returned in 2020 with the short film Devi, followed by Yaara opposite Vidyut Jammwal and in the Amazon Prime anthology film Putham Pudhu Kaalai in which she appeared in the segment Coffee, anyone? directed by her cousin Suhasini Maniratnam.

Later in 2021, she appeared in the Telugu action film Krack opposite Ravi Teja, marking their second collaboration after the 2013 film Balupu. She also worked opposite Jammwal in the Mahesh Manjrekar film The Power. Later that year, she starred in three other projects, which include the Pawan Kalyan starrer Vakeel Saab, Netflix anthology Pitta Kathalu in the segment directed by Nag Ashwin and Vijay Sethupathi's Laabam.

Upcoming projects 
Hassan will appear alongside Prabhas in Salaar, where she will be seen as Aadya. The film will mark her Kannada film debut. She will also share screen space with Nandamuri Balakrishna, for the first time, in Gopichand Malineni's Veera Simha Reddy. She has also signed to play the lead, next to Chiranjeevi, in Waltair Veerayya, directed by K. S. Ravindra.

Other ventures 

Haasan made her television debut in 2018 as a Host in the Tamil show Hello Sago. She then made her American television debut with Treadstone, portraying Nira Patel. She made her Hindi web debut with Best Seller in 2022. Times of India noted, "Shruti Haasan de-glams for Meetu Mathur and after a few initial moments of discomfort in front of the camera, her act picks up pace."

In 2020, she worked in a short film, Devi. It depicts nine women forced into a sisterhood due to circumstance in which they are compelled to share their stories of abuse. Hindustan Times stated, "Shruti Haasan is a glam diva who sparingly speaks. She, Kajol and Neha Dhupia lead the spirited group of women."

In addition to acting, Haasan is also an established playback singer. She has received nominations for the Filmfare Award for Best Female Playback Singer – Tamil for singing "Kannazhaga Kaalazhaga" in 3 (2012) and "Yendi Yendi" in Puli (2015); and the Filmfare Award for Best Female Playback Singer – Telugu for "Junction Lo" in Aagadu (2014). She has also sung songs in Hindi films including "Aazma (Luck Is The Key)" for Luck, "Alvida" for D-Day and "Joganiyan" for Tevar.

Haasan began her career as a music director with her father's production Unnaipol Oruvan (2009) and has since formed her own music band. She won the Best Music Director award for Unnaipol Oruvan at Edison Awards. Screen India said that she "has the makings of a good singer, and with some training she should go great guns."

Personal life and other work 

Haasan earlier dated London based actor Michael Corsale, of Italian descent. She broke up with him in 2019. Haasan is in a relationship with autodidact visual artist, Santanu Hazarika, since 2020.

Haasan is associated with a lot of social causes. She has been associated with RPG foundation, an NGO committed towards women empowerment. She was a part of Julio Ribeiro campaign for Jammu and Kashmir floods of 2014, where she donated a large sum for the cause. For Bal Asha Trust, Mumbai, she organised an online clothes sale and promoted circular fashion. In 2019, she attended a painting exhibition, to raise funds for children of Bai Jerbai Wadia Hospital for Children.

In 2014, she lent her voice for a digital campaign called TeachAIDS to spread AIDS awareness. Haasan made her Cannes Film Festival appearance in 2017, where she also graced the red carpet for British author Neil Gaiman. She has ramp walked at the Lakme Fashion Week and has been cover model for various magazines.

Haasan has performed at various film awards and other events. She has done music gigs in London. She was signed as the brand ambassador for WWF India. Haasan also conducted an online session on social topics such as mental health, women in films and media and sustainability in fashion.

Controversy 
Haasan has been surrounded by various controversies. Post her debut, the actress went under the knife for her nose to get that perfect face. She received several criticism for the same. She said, "As far as my nose surgery goes, it's a choice I made, even after my first film was done because my nose was broken. I didn't like the way it felt. I didn't like the way it looked. It was a personal choice. Nobody asked me to fix it."

Artistry and public image 
Haasan is considered among the most popular actor of Telugu cinema. She is one of the highest paid actresses in South Indian cinema, according to various media reports. Haasan has appeared in Forbes India Celebrity 100 list.

With her debut films Anaganaga O Dheerudu and 7aum Arivu, critics stated that, "she shows promise.". Her career marked a turning point with 3. She went onto achieve praises for her portrayals in mainstream Telugu and Tamil films, in particular for Oh My Friend, Race Gurram, Srimanthudu, Premam and Si3. She has been termed, "fine performer", "graceful", "revelation" and "gorgeous" for her performances in these films. She has often been cast opposite the same actors more than once, featuring in two or more films with Pawan Kalyan, Suriya, Ravi Teja and Siddharth. She even proved to be the "lucky charm", for some of them.

Suresh Krishnamoorthy of The Hindu find her to be "down-to-earth and someone who conceals her not-so-ok Telugu with a dazzling smile". Manjusha Radhakrishnan of Gulf News noted, "Haasan is one of the rare talents who doesn't take the star part of the celebrity too seriously." GQ India finds Haasan to be "a talented actress, a gifted singer and one helluva looker". While praising her music skills, Verve termed her a "multifaceted artiste". She has been placed in Rediffs "Top Tamil Actresses" of 2012 List. She is also listed among the "Hottest South Indian" actresses. She stood at the 24th place on Forbes India's most influential stars on Instagram in South cinema for the year 2021.

Haasan has frequently featured on Hyderabad Times' Most Desirable Woman and Chennai Times' Most Desirable Woman list. She became Hyderabad's Most Desirable Woman in 2013 and 2020 and became Chennai's Most Desirable Woman in 2013. Haasan is a prominent celebrity endorser for brands and products. She was signed as a brand ambassador for Lloyd. She also endorses Emami Navratna cool talc. She is a brand ambassador for Fossil watches in India. Other brands endrosed by her include Philips, Paksha and Crizal.

Accolades

See also 
 List of Indian film actresses

References

External links 
 
 

1986 births
Living people
21st-century Indian actresses
21st-century Indian singers
21st-century Indian women singers
Actresses from Chennai
Singers from Chennai
Female models from Chennai
Women musicians from Tamil Nadu
Actresses in Hindi cinema
Actresses in Tamil cinema
Actresses in Telugu cinema
Women rock singers
Filmfare Awards South winners
Indian women playback singers
Indian women pop singers
Indian film actresses
Indian television actresses
Indian web series actresses
Actresses in Hindi television
Actresses in Tamil television
Indian folk-pop singers
Indian rhythm and blues singers
Indian rock musicians
Indian rock singers
Indian Tamil people
Indian voice actresses
Kamal Haasan
Marathi people
South Indian International Movie Awards winners
Indian expatriate actresses in the United States
Musicians Institute alumni
Tamil actresses
Tamil film score composers
Tamil playback singers
Bollywood playback singers
Tamil singers
Telugu playback singers